Barry Boom (born Paul Robinson) is a reggae singer and record producer from London.

Paul Robinson was a member of the reggae group One Blood in the 1980s along with his brothers Errol, Jerry, Ewan & Trevor until the group broke up after Errol's death. One Blood released two albums in 1982 - In Love and Super Showcase. He also worked as a producer and songwriter for other artists, including the debut album by Maxi Priest and Philip Papa Levi's "Mi God Mi King" single (the first single by a UK-born artist to reach number one in Jamaica).  After One Blood, he worked with Sly & Robbie before pursuing a solo career under the name Barry Boom, which he had previously used as a pseudonym for his production work. He signed to Fashion Records and his first solo releases in 1989 included reggae number ones with "Making Love" and "Number One Girl", and "Hurry Over". His debut solo album, The Living Boom followed in 1990, featuring his three big hits from the previous year. He followed this with Trust Me in 1993, and signed to MCA Records for Taste of Things to Come in 1997.

He later moved into gospel reggae, releasing the album His Love in 2018.

Discography
The Living Boom (1990), Fine Style/Fashion
Trust Me (1993), Merger
Taste of Things to Come (1997), Victor/MCA
Everyday Life (2012)
His Love (2018)

Compilations
The Best of Barry Boom (1996), Sony

References

English male singers
British reggae musicians
Living people
Year of birth missing (living people)